The FIS Alpine World Ski Championships 1987 were held in Crans-Montana, Switzerland, from 27 January to 8 February 1987.

The alpine world championships included Super-G for the first time; it was first run on the World Cup level four seasons earlier, in December 1982.

The host Swiss team won eight gold medals out of ten, including all five women's events.

Men's competitions

Downhill
Date: January 31

Super-G

Date: February 2

Giant Slalom
Date: February 4

Slalom
Date: February 8

Combination
Date: January 27, February 1

Women's competitions

Downhill

Date: February 1

Super-G
Date: February 3

Giant Slalom

Date: February 5

Slalom

Date: February 7

Combination
Date: January 29–30

Medals table

References

External links
FIS-ski.com - results - 1987 World Championships - Crans-Montana, Switzerland
FIS-ski.com - results - World Championships
Ski-db.com - 1987 Crans-Montana - Alpine World Ski Championships

FIS Alpine World Ski Championships
1987
A
1987 in Swiss sport
Alpine skiing competitions in Switzerland
January 1987 sports events in Europe
February 1987 sports events in Europe